Lyctoxylon dentatum is a species of powderpost beetle. A type of woodboring beetle, it was first described in 1866 by Francis Polkinghorne Pascoe.

Bostrichidae
Beetles described in 1866
Taxa named by Francis Polkinghorne Pascoe